CCC Recreation Building-Nature Museum is a historic building located at McCormick's Creek State Park in Washington Township, Owen County, Indiana.  It was built by the Civilian Conservation Corps in 1933, and is a one-story, frame building with board-and-batten siding and American Craftsman style design elements. It consists of a rectangular hip roofed main section, with a gabled wing.  The wing features a large stone fireplace. The building was rehabilitated for use as a nature museum by the Works Progress Administration in 1936, and remained in that use into the 1970s.

It was listed on the National Register of Historic Places in 1993.

References

Civilian Conservation Corps in Indiana
Works Progress Administration in Indiana
Park buildings and structures on the National Register of Historic Places in Indiana
Government buildings completed in 1933
Natural history museums in Indiana
National Register of Historic Places in Owen County, Indiana
Museums on the National Register of Historic Places